Karina Mirzoeva (born 12 March 2004) is a Tajik football and futsal player who plays as a defender for Tajik women's football club Zeboniso in the Tajik women's league and the Tajikistan women's national football team.

Club career
Mirzoeva has played for the women's football club of Zeboniso since 2018, when she was 14.

International career
Mirzoeva was called up to the Tajik team for the first time in her career in 2019. At age 15, She played her first game in a (12–0) loss to Uzbekistan in the Cup of Hope hosted by the Kyrgyz Football Union.

Mirzoeva made the first-ever Tajikistan women's national futsal team in 2022 when they participated in the 2022 CAFA Women's Futsal Championship.

Personal life
Mirzoeva is the ambassador of the international book society of the Tajik branch of Parimatch.

Honours

Tajikistan (Futsal)
CAFA Women's Futsal Championship:

  Third place: 2023

Zeboniso
Tajikistan women's Higher League:
  Champions: 2018, 2020, 2022
  Runners-up: 2019, 2021

References

2004 births
Living people
Tajikistani women's footballers
Women's association football forwards
Tajikistan women's international footballers